The Towerrunning World Championships is a global tower running competition organised by the Towerrunning World Association (TWA), the global body for competitive stair climbing. The first edition was held in 2015, and the second edition was held in 2018. It became part of the TWA's Towerrunning Tour for its third edition in 2020, although that competition was postponed due to the COVID-19 pandemic. The venues for the championships are skyscrapers that host annual competitions, with the Aspire Tower and Taipei 101 hosting the 2015 and 2018 events, respectively.

Editions

, the next World Championships is due to be held in 2023.

References

External links
 
 Towerrunning World Championship 2015 - Aspire Zone - Qatar via YouTube
 Towerrunning World Championships 2018 - Taipei 101 via YouTube

World Championships
Towerrunning
Recurring sporting events established in 2015